Wallace Hogue (9 December 1879 – 1 June 1946) was an Australian cricketer. He played eight first-class matches for Western Australia between 1907/08 and 1912/13.

See also
 List of Western Australia first-class cricketers

References

External links
 

1879 births
1946 deaths
Australian cricketers
Western Australia cricketers
Cricketers from Newcastle, New South Wales